Unniyarcha is a 1961 Indian Malayalam-language action film, produced and directed by Kunchacko. The film stars Ragini, Prem Nazir, Sathyan, Thikkurissy Sukumaran Nair and Hari. Based on the life of warrior of the same name mentioned in Vadakkan Pattukal, it was released on 24 August 1961 and became a success.

Plot

Cast 
Ragini as Unniyarcha
Prem Nazir as Attumanamel Kunjiraman
Sathyan as Aromal Chekavar
Thikkurissy Sukumaran Nair as Kannappa Chekavar
Hari as Aromalunni
Kottayam Chellappan as Chandu
Reetha as Kunjunnooli
Palakunnel Sunny as Aringoder 
S. P. Pillai as Panen

Production 
Unniyarcha is the first feature film based on Vadakkan Pattukal, a collection of Malayalam ballads. P. K. Sarangapani wrote the dialogues in North Malabar dialect. The film was predominantly shot in Kerala's backwaters.

Soundtrack 
The music was composed by K. Raghavan and lyrics were written by P. Bhaskaran and P. K. Sarangapani.

Release 
Unniyarcha was released on 24 August 1961, around the time of Onam. The film was a commercial success, and inspired more screen adaptations of legends from Vadakkan Pattukal.

References

External links 
 

1960s Malayalam-language films
1961 films
Hindu mythological films
Indian action films